Pom Simona (born 21 July 1979) is an Australian professional rugby union football coach. He is currently the head coach of the Melbourne Rising team that plays in the NRC competition, and also head coach of the Melbourne Harlequins. Simona had previously represented the Rising team in the 2014 and 2015 additions of the NRC.

References

1979 births
Living people
Australian rugby union coaches
Melbourne Rebels coaches
Melbourne Rising players